Bijuri is a town and a Municipality or Municipal Council or Nagar Palika Parishad in Anuppur district  in the state of Madhya Pradesh, India.

Bijuri is a developing town with a good Market.

Geography 

Transport

Rail connectivity

Bijuri railway station is situated in Anuppur–Ambikapur rail route, and is a LOCO railway station on this route. Bijuri railway station has three platforms.

Following is the list of all the trains starts from and pass through Bijuri (BJRI) Railway Station:

To ABKP

 Durg - Ambikapur Express
 Manendergarh - Ambikapur Passenger 
 Shahdol- Ambikapur Memu 
 Shahdol - Ambikapur Passenger 
 Jabalpur - Ambikapur Intercity Express

To CHRM

 Rewa - Chirimiri Fast Passenger 
 Bilaspur - Chirimiri Passenger 
 Anuppur - Chirimiri Passenger 
 Chandia Road - Chirimiri Passenger 
 Katni - Chirimiri Passenger 
 Anuppur - Manendragarh Passenger

To APR

 Ambikapur - Durg Passenger Express (18242)
 Chirimiri - Durg Passenger Express (28242)
 Chirimiri - Saugor Passenger (51755)
 Ambikapur - Jabalpur Intercity Express (11266)
 Chirimiri - Chandia Road Passenger (58221)
 Ambikapur - Shahdol Passenger (58702)
 Ambikapur - Anuppur Passenger (58224)
 Chirimiri - Rewa Fast Passenger (51754)
 Ambikapur - Anuppur Menu (68750)
 Chirimiri - Bilasapur Passenger (58220)

By Road
National High way 43 connects Bijuri with other parts of the state. Buses services are operating between cities of Madhya Pradesh, Chhattisgarh, Uttar Pradesh, Jharkhand and Bihar.

By Air 
The nearest airport is Bilasa Devi Kevat Airport, which is located in Bilaspur.

Demographics
In a 2011 census, Bijuri had a population of 32,682.

Economy
Bijuri is a coal mining area.  Bijuri is one of the Sub-Area of Hasdeo Area (SECL) Controlling many Coal Mines of this region Under the Umbrella of Bijuri Sub-Area Office.

References

Cities and towns in Anuppur district